Eupithecia gueneata is a moth in the family Geometridae. It is found in most of southern and eastern Europe, as well as the Near East and North Africa.

The wingspan is about 20 mm. Adults are on wing from the end of June to mid August.

The larvae feed on various Apiaceae species, including Peucedanum species (including Peucedanum oreoselinum) and Pimpinella saxifraga. Larvae can be found from July to October.

Subspecies
Eupithecia gueneata gueneata
Eupithecia gueneata plantei Herbulot, 1981

References

Moths described in 1862
gueneata
Moths of Europe
Moths of Asia
Moths of Africa
Taxa named by Pierre Millière